Eporectis is a genus of moths of the family Erebidae. The genus was erected by Edward Meyrick in 1902. Both species are found in the Australian state of Queensland.

Species
 Eporectis phenax Meyrick, 1902
 Eporectis tephropis Turner, 1902

References

Calpinae
Noctuoidea genera